Johann George Ludwig Hesekiel (12 August 1819 – 26 February 1874) was a German author from Halle, where his father, distinguished as a writer of sacred poetry, was a Lutheran pastor.

Hesekiel studied history and philosophy in Halle, Jena and Berlin, and devoted himself in early life to journalism and literature. In 1848 he settled in Berlin, where he lived until his death, achieving a considerable reputation as a writer and as editor of the Neue Preussische Zeitung.

He attempted many different kinds of literary work, the most ambitious being perhaps his patriotic songs Preussenlieder, of which he published a volume during the revolutionary excitement of 1848–1849. Another collection, Neue Preussenlieder, appeared in 1864 after the Danish War, and a third in 1870, Gegen die Franzosen, Preussische Kriegs- und Königslieder, during the Franco-Prussian War.

Among his novels may be mentioned Unter dem Eisenzohn (1864) and Der Schultheiss vom Zeyst (1875). The best known of his works is his biography of Prince Otto von Bismarck (Das Buch vom Fursten Bismarck) (3rd ed., 1873; English trans. by RH Mackenzie).

References

1819 births
1874 deaths
Writers from Halle (Saale)
People from the Province of Saxony
Martin Luther University of Halle-Wittenberg alumni
University of Jena alumni
Humboldt University of Berlin alumni
German male writers